Bell Bay Provincial Park is a non-operating provincial park about  west of Barry's Bay, Renfrew, Ontario, Canada. The park includes an example of Black Ash swamp.

References

External links

Provincial parks of Ontario
Protected areas of Renfrew County
Protected areas established in 1989
1989 establishments in Ontario